Dyavaprthivi is a Sanskrit dvandva, or compound word, meaning "heaven and earth". The term occurs 65 times in the Rig Veda. Dyavaprthivi has mistakenly been labeled a Hindu god who later split into Dyaus, the Sky Father, and Prthivi, the Earth Mother.

References 

Sanskrit words and phrases